Ossudu is a legislative assembly constituency in the Union territory of Puducherry in India.
 Ossudu assembly constituency is part of Puducherry (Lok Sabha constituency). This assembly constituency is reserved for SC candidates.

Members of Legislative Assembly

Election Result

2021 election

References 

Assembly constituencies of Puducherry